The 1998 WPF Draft was the second annual collegiate draft for the WPSL/WPF's 1998 season, and was held on December 7, in Palm Springs, CA  in conjunction with the 1998 NFCA National Convention. Draft order was based on teams' finish in 1997.  Georgia Pride and Carolina Diamonds tied with the same record during the 1997 regular season.  Georgia lost more games to Carolina in the 1997 head-to-head series and chose ahead of Carolina in the odd-numbered rounds.  Carolina chose ahead of Georgia in the even numbered rounds.

Following are the 60 selections from the 1998 WPF draft:

1998 WPF Draft

Position key: 
C = catcher; INF = infielder; SS = shortstop; OF = outfielder; UT = Utility infielder; P = pitcher; RHP = right-handed pitcher; LHP = left-handed pitcher
Positions will be listed as combined for those who can play multiple positions.

Round 1

Round 2

Round 3

Round 4

Round 5

Round 6

Round 7

Round 8

Round 9

Round 10

Draft notes

References 

1998 in softball